Smokey and the Bandit II is a 1980 American action comedy film directed by Hal Needham, and starring Burt Reynolds, Sally Field, Jerry Reed, Jackie Gleason and Dom DeLuise. The film is the sequel to the 1977 film Smokey and the Bandit.

The film was originally released in the United Kingdom, New Zealand, Australia and several other, mainly Commonwealth, countries as Smokey and the Bandit Ride Again.

The plot centers on Bo "Bandit" Darville (Burt Reynolds) and Cledus "Snowman" Snow (Jerry Reed), transporting an elephant to the GOP National Convention, with Sheriff Buford T. Justice (Jackie Gleason) once again in hot pursuit.

Plot 
Big Enos Burdette is in a literal mudslinging campaign against John Conn for Governor of Texas. After failing to get the outgoing governor's endorsement, Big Enos overhears him on the phone ordering a crate in Miami to be delivered in nine days to the Republican National Convention in Dallas. Burdette schemes to earn the governor's endorsement and have the crate delivered to the convention in his name and tracks down Cledus "Snowman" Snow and offers him and Bo "Bandit" Darville $200,000 to do the run. Cledus takes the Burdettes to Bandit to make the offer in person, but Bandit has become a heavy drinker since breaking up with Carrie ("Frog") and is drunk when the Burdettes arrive and double the payoff to $400,000. Cledus accepts on Bandit's behalf, but adds that Big Enos should give them half in advance, to which they agree. Cledus is ecstatic, but Bandit begins to miss Carrie.

Cledus calls Carrie, who is back in Texarkana and again about to marry Junior when Cledus calls offering her $50,000 to help out; she agrees and again becomes a runaway bride. Though she still has feelings for Bandit, when Carrie arrives, she initially intones she is only in it for the money, and she and Cledus work on getting Bandit off the booze and back into shape. She then trades in Junior's car for a new Trans Am. The group arrive at the pier in Miami only to find out the manifest is quarantined for three weeks. They return later that night to steal it, only to find the "package" is a live elephant (the G.O.P. mascot) which Cledus names "Charlotte" after his aunt. When Bandit removes a splinter from Charlotte's foot, she takes a liking to him.

Soon after the trio start off for Dallas, they are accosted for the first of several times by Sheriff Justice, but Bandit outwits him and they escape. En route, they stop at a remote fuel station and notice something wrong with Charlotte. Moments later, an ambulance pulls in with an Italian gynecologist in the back; "Doc" is initially reluctant to help, but when his driver speeds off unknowingly leaving him stranded, he asks to hitch a ride with them, agreeing to watch Charlotte.

Doc later finds that Charlotte is pregnant and due to give birth any time, but Bandit is determined to stay on schedule. Entering Louisiana, Doc says that Charlotte is almost in labor and needs to be off her feet. Cledus chooses they all need a break and they go to a nearby nightclub where Don Williams is headlining.  When Carrie sees Bandit scribbling on a napkin a picture of Charlotte cradled by suspended netting to keep her off her feet, she angrily leaves, but not before telling Bandit that she will come back only when he likes himself again. Later that night, a drunken Bandit makes his drawing a reality, and Doc agrees that his idea will work.

Buford intends to call for help from his brothers Reggie, a Mountie Sergeant in Quebec, and Gaylord, an effeminate Texas State Patrolman. Later, as Bandit and Cledus enter Texas, Buford lures the Bandit into a trap: a mass of 40 Texas Patrol and Mountie cruisers pursuing him across a desert basin. Bandit orders Cledus to get to Dallas, but he enlists a large convoy of his trucker pals and comes to Bandit's rescue instead, wrecking nearly all of the cruisers in a giant demolition derby while Doc and Charlotte watch from the sidelines. The two escape by crossing a makeshift trailer bridge with Buford and his brothers in pursuit. Two of the trucks pull away, resulting in Gaylord and Reggie's cruisers crashing in the ensuing gap before they can cross, but Buford is still in pursuit, though his cruiser is barely functioning.

Cledus begs Bandit to stop at a safari reserve, where Charlotte finally gives birth to her baby. Bandit is ready to load them both back up in the truck, but Cledus refuses and then knocks Bandit down when he insults him. When he sees Charlotte in tears, Bandit finally comes to his senses and apologizes.

Bandit later finds Carrie and tells her that he likes himself now, and that he does not want to be without her. He then tells her that he has not yet taken Charlotte to Dallas, but they can still make it. Carrie is overjoyed when she sees Charlotte's baby, and Bandit asks Charlotte's permission for him and Carrie to get hitched, to which Charlotte trumpets her approval; Doc, now riding in the cab with Cledus and Fred, also voices his approval, and they all drive away with Charlotte and her baby in tow in circus carts, with Buford still in pursuit, now driving a Greyhound bus.

Cast 
 Burt Reynolds as Bo "The Bandit" Darville
 Jackie Gleason as Sheriff Buford T. Justice / Gaylord Justice (credited as Ms. Jackie Gleason) / Reginald Van Justice
 Jerry Reed as Cledus "The Snowman" Snow
 Dom DeLuise as Dr. Frederico "Doc" Carlucci
 Sally Field as Carrie "Frog"
 Pat McCormick as Enos "Big Enos" Burdette
 Paul Williams as Enos "Little Enos" Burdette
 David Huddleston as John Conn
 Mike Henry as Junior Justice
 John Anderson as The Governor
 Brenda Lee as Nice Lady
 The Statler Brothers as Themselves:
 Phil Balsley
 Lew DeWitt
 Don Reid
 Harold Reid
 "Mean Joe" Greene as himself
 Mel Tillis as Fairground Owner
 Joe Klecko as himself
 Don Williams as himself
 Terry Bradshaw as himself
 Nancy Lenehan as Ramona
 John Megna as P.T.
 Chuck Yeager as Party Guest
 John Robert Nicholson as The Patient
 1980 Pontiac Trans Am as "Son of Trigger"

Production 
Smokey and the Bandit II was filmed simultaneously with The Cannonball Run, in which Burt Reynolds and Dom DeLuise also starred. Football players Joe Klecko and Terry Bradshaw also appear in both films.

It is the first film to feature director Hal Needham's "Blooper Reel Credit Crawl" at the end, in that a collection of bloopers and outtakes from the film showed on one side of the screen while the closing credits slowly scrolled up the other side. Cannonball Run, also directed by Needham, used this same technique.

Buford's brothers were both portrayed by Gleason; "Reggie" was a Canadian version of "Reginald Van Gleason III", a popular character from Gleason's television show.

The film was written and produced before it was announced that the 1980 Republican National Convention would be held in Detroit rather than Dallas.

Many of the movie's scenes take place in northern Palm Beach County, especially at Burt Reynolds' ranch in Jupiter, Florida.

Although the Bandit again sticks to a Pontiac Trans Am, this time a 1980 Turbo model with five color decals unlike 1981's single color decals, the Snowman switches to a 1980 GMC General, silver with blue trim with the same mural on the trailer as in the original film. This "new rig" suggests that the pair were successful in the "double or nothing" wager offered by the Burdettes at the end of the first film, where they were persuaded to drive from Atlanta to Boston and back in 18 hours to buy clam chowder and bring it to the Burdettes.

A world-record automobile jump was captured on film during the "roundup sequence", when stuntman Gary Davis jumped a 1974 Dodge Monaco over 150 feet. Davis suffered compressed vertebrae as a result of a hard landing.

The roundup sequence in the desert shows many new Pontiac Le Mans sedans decorated as police cars being destroyed. The cars were originally ordered by a car rental agency in Phoenix, who refused to accept the delivery when they discovered the cars were not equipped with air conditioning. Pontiac took the cars back and eventually gave them to the producers to be used in the film.

Soundtrack

Smokey and the Bandit 2: Original Soundtrack was released on vinyl, cassette tape and 8-track tape by MCA Records in 1980.

Track listing

Reception

Box office 
Smokey and the Bandit II grossed $10,883,835 in its opening weekend, the second highest ever at the time, behind Star Trek: The Motion Picture. It also set a record for an opening week, with a gross of $18,108,031. It was the eighth-most-popular 1980 film at the United States and Canada box office earning $66,132,626. This box office income inspired a third film.

Critical response 
The film received almost completely negative reviews from critics who felt that it suffered badly in comparison to the original. On Rotten Tomatoes, it has an approval rating of 14% based on reviews from seven critics. Roger Ebert gave it a one out of four stars and stated that there was "[in 1980] no need for this movie. That's true of most sequels, but it's especially true of Smokey and the Bandit II, which is basically just the original movie done again, not as well ... how can I say it's lazy when it has 50 trucks doing stunts in it? Because it takes a lot less thought to fill up a movie with stunts than to create a comedy that's genuinely funny".

Burt Reynolds later said that he did not enjoy working on the film at all, feeling that it was an unnecessary sequel put together by Universal purely for money-making reasons rather than to try making a good picture.

Sequel
The film was followed by another sequel three years later, Smokey and the Bandit Part 3 (1983), in which Reynolds only made a brief cameo appearance, and Sally Field did not appear.

References

External links 

 
 
 
 
 
 

1980 films
1980s action comedy films
American action comedy films
1980s chase films
1980s English-language films
Films about automobiles
Films directed by Hal Needham
Films shot in Atlanta
Pittsburgh Steelers in popular culture
American sequel films
Smokey and the Bandit
Trucker films
Films about elephants
Universal Pictures films
Films with screenplays by Jerry Belson
1980 comedy films
1980s American films